Emma Capital  (stylised as EMMA Capital) is a Czech investment management company. The company currently has 3 private equity funds (Emma Alpha, Emma Gamma, and Emma Omega) that own portfolios in consumer finance, gas distribution, lottery and gaming.

History
EMMA Capital was founded by former PPF shareholder Jiří Šmejc. In 2013 Šmejc withdrew as a shareholder of PPF. In turn, Šmejc acquired the minority share of Home Credit, in which PPF remains as the major shareholder. Šmejc has put the stake to EMMA Omega, which belongs to EMMA Capital structure. Another portfolio, Eldorado, was jointly sold by EMMA Capital and PPF in 2016.

Group structure

EMMA Capital
EMMA Capital is the investment management company of the group, in which (as of October 2020) Jiří Šmejc owns 64.7% stake. The other partners are Pavel Horák, Tomáš Kočka, Ondřej Frydrych, Michal Houšť, and Peter Stohr.

EMMA Alpha
EMMA Alpha is a private equity fund in which the founder and majority owner of EMMA Capital, Jiří Šmejc, owns 94.94% investment shares via his own company MEF Holdings (the rest is owned by other partners). EMMA Capital owns 100% voting share of EMMA Alpha as manager. EMMA Alpha is the parent company of EMMA Gamma and EMMA Omega.

As of October 2020, EMMA Alpha also owns Romanian gas distribution company Premier Energy and Moldovan electricity distribution company Premier Energy via Cyprus based holding company Premier Energy Cyprus.

EMMA Gamma
EMMA Gamma is 100% owned by EMMA Alpha. EMMA Gamma owns 67% stake in Croatian betting company SuperSport. The stake has been acquired as a consequence of Sazka Group split which has happened in 2019.

Until May 2019, EMMA Gamma used to own 25% stake of Sazka Group;  used to be the major shareholder of Sazka Group for 75% stake. After the split it holds 100% of Sazka Group.

Sazka Group also owned 33% stake in Greek lottery company OPAP through the investment fund EMMA Delta (after the split recently renamed to SAZKA Delta AIF Variable Capital Investment Company).

EMMA Omega
EMMA Omega owns 8.876% stake of Home Credit (as well as subsidiary Air Bank), a consumer finance company.

References

External links
  

Financial services companies of the Czech Republic